Mohammed Lotfy Shabana (born 31 March 1931) was a senior commander in the Egyptian Air Force, serving as its commander from 6 April 1980 to 15 April 1982.

At the end of March 1982, Shabana personally received six General Dynamics F-16 Fighting Falcon aircraft as part of an upgrade to Egypt's F-16 fighter squadrons.

Notes

External links
Egyptian Air Force - Maj. Gen. Mohammed Lotfy Shabana

1931 births
Egyptian Air Force air marshals
Living people